Andy Murray defeated Novak Djokovic in the final, 6–4, 4–6, 6–3, to win the men's singles tennis title at the 2015 Canadian Open.	 It was Murray's first win against Djokovic since the 2013 Wimbledon final, having lost eight consecutive matches to him in that span.

Jo-Wilfried Tsonga was the defending champion, but lost in the quarterfinals to Murray.

Seeds
The top eight seeds received a bye into the second round. 

 Novak Djokovic (final)
 Andy Murray (champion)
 Stan Wawrinka (second round, retired because of a back injury)
 Kei Nishikori (semifinals)
 Tomáš Berdych (second round)
 Marin Čilić (second round)
 Rafael Nadal (quarterfinals)
 Milos Raonic (second round)

 Gilles Simon (second round)
 Jo-Wilfried Tsonga (quarterfinals)
 Richard Gasquet (withdrew due to an illness)
 Kevin Anderson (first round)
 David Goffin (third round)
 Grigor Dimitrov (second round)
 Gaël Monfils (second round)
 John Isner (quarterfinals)

Draw

Finals

Top half

Section 1

Section 2

Bottom half

Section 3

Section 4

Qualifying

Seeds

Qualifiers

Lucky losers
  Nicolas Mahut

Qualifying draw

First qualifier

Second qualifier

Third qualifier

Fourth qualifier

Fifth qualifier

Sixth qualifier

Seventh qualifier

References

External links

Men's Singles